Ugo Amaldi (18 April 1875 – 11 November 1957) was an Italian mathematician. He contributed to the field of analytic geometry and worked on Lie groups. His son Edoardo was a physicist.

Biography
He graduated in mathematics (21 November 1898) at the University of Bologna under the guidance of S. Pincherle. He taught at the University of Cagliari (1903-1905), Modena (1905-1919), Padova (1919-1924), Roma (1924-1950).

Notes

External links
 

1875 births
1954 deaths
20th-century Italian mathematicians
University of Bologna alumni
Members of the Pontifical Academy of Sciences
Scientists from Verona